The bamboo mosaic virus satellite RNA cis-regulatory element is an RNA element found in the 5' UTR of the genome of the bamboo mosaic virus. This element is thought to be essential for efficient RNA replication.

See also 
Bamboo mosaic potexvirus (BaMV) cis-regulatory element
Potato virus X cis-acting regulatory element
Poxvirus AX element late mRNA cis-regulatory element

References

External links 
 

Cis-regulatory RNA elements
Potexviruses